Uvis Stazdiņš (born 5 October 1999) is a Latvian handball player for HC Kehra and the Latvian national team.

He represented Latvia at the 2020 European Men's Handball Championship.

References

1999 births
Living people
Latvian male handball players
Expatriate handball players
Latvian expatriate sportspeople in Estonia